The 1994 FIBA European League Final Four, or 1994 FIBA EuroLeague Final Four, was the 1993–94 season's FIBA European League Final Four tournament, organized by FIBA Europe.

7up Joventut won its first title, after defeating Olympiacos in the final game.

Bracket

Semifinals

Olympiacos – Panathinaikos

7up Joventut – FC Barcelona Banca Catalana

Third place game

Final

Final standings

Awards

FIBA European League Final Four MVP 
  Žarko Paspalj ( Olympiacos)

FIBA European League Finals Top Scorer 
  Ferran Martínez ( 7up Joventut)

FIBA European League All-Final Four Team

References

External links 
 1993–94 EuroLeague at FIBAEurope.com
 Linguasport
 1994 Final Four at Euroleague.net, interview to Jordi Villacampa

1993-1994
1993–94 in European basketball
1993–94 in Spanish basketball
1993–94 in Greek basketball
1993–94 in Israeli basketball
International basketball competitions hosted by Israel
Basketball, 1994 European League Final Four
1990s in Tel Aviv